White Wilderness may refer to:

 Puszcza Biała, the White Wilderness in Poland
 White Wilderness (film), a 1958 Disney documentary noted for its propagation of the myth of lemming suicide
 White Mountain Wilderness, a protected wilderness area within the Lincoln National Forest